Justin Deaon Tryon (born May 29, 1984) is a former American football cornerback. He was drafted by the Washington Redskins in the fourth round of the 2008 NFL Draft. He also played for the Indianapolis Colts and New York Giants.

Early life
Tryon was born Northridge, California. He played for Littlerock High School and graduated from William Howard Taft High School (Los Angeles). He played college football at Arizona State University and College of the Canyons. Justin started all 26 games during his two seasons at ASU. Earned Second-team All-Conference honors as a senior after being named honorable mention All-Pac 10 as a junior. Won junior college national championship game in 2005.

Professional career

Washington Redskins
On June 13, 2008, Tryon officially signed a three-year contract with the Redskins. He had 26 tackles and one interception during the season.

Indianapolis Colts
On September 4, 2010, he was traded from the Redskins to the Indianapolis Colts for an undisclosed draft pick. Tryon had an interception during a 2010 wild card matchup against the Jets before the half. The Colts lost the game on a late field goal, 16-17. He was released by the Colts on September 28, 2011.

New York Giants
He signed with the New York Giants on October 4, 2011. He played for the Giants for both the 2011 and 2012 seasons.

References

External links
 
 New York Giants bio
 Arizona State Sun Devils bio
 Official Website
 Justin Tryon Speed & Fitness
 Fox Sports
 CBS Sports.com

1984 births
Living people
American football cornerbacks
College of the Canyons Cougars football players
Arizona State Sun Devils football players
Players of American football from Los Angeles
Washington Redskins players
Indianapolis Colts players
New York Giants players
People from Northridge, Los Angeles
People from Woodland Hills, Los Angeles
William Howard Taft Charter High School alumni